Bochum I is an electoral constituency (German: Wahlkreis) represented in the Bundestag. It elects one member via first-past-the-post voting. Under the current constituency numbering system, it is designated as constituency 140. It is located in the Ruhr region of North Rhine-Westphalia, comprising the western and central part of the city of Bochum.

Bochum I was created for the inaugural 1949 federal election. Since 2002, it has been represented by Axel Schäfer of the Social Democratic Party (SPD).

Geography
Bochum I is located in the Ruhr region of North Rhine-Westphalia. As of the 2021 federal election, it comprises the city districts (Stadtbezirke) of 1 Bochum-Mitte, 2 Bochum-Wattenscheid, 5 Bochum-Süd, and 6 Bochum-Südwest from the independent city of Bochum.

History
Bochum I was created in 1949, then known as Bochum. It acquired its current name in the 1980 election. In the 1949 election, it was North Rhine-Westphalia constituency 59 in the numbering system. From 1953 through 1961, it was number 118. From 1965 through 1976, it was number 117. From 1980 through 1998, it was number 110. From 2002 through 2009, it was number 141. Since 2013, it has been number 140.

Originally, the constituency was coterminous with the independent city of Bochum. From 1965 through 1976, it comprised western parts of Bochum. From 1980 through 1998, it comprised the 1 Bochum-Mitte, 2 Bochum-Wattenscheid, and 6 Bochum-Südwest Stadtbezirke from Bochum. It acquired its current borders in the 2002 election.

Members
The constituency has been held by the Social Democratic Party (SPD) during all but two Bundestag terms since its creation. It was first represented by Erich Ollenhauer of the SPD 1949 until 1953, when it was won by Franzjosef Müser of the Christian Democratic Union (CDU) for two terms. Heinrich Deist regained it for the SPD in 1961 and served a single term. Karl Liedtke was elected in 1965 and served until 1987. He was succeeded by Klaus Hasenfratz, who was then representative until 2002. Axel Schäfer was elected in 2002 and re-elected in 2005, 2009, 2013, 2017, and 2021.

Election results

2021 election

2017 election

2013 election

2009 election

References

Federal electoral districts in North Rhine-Westphalia
1949 establishments in West Germany
Constituencies established in 1949
Bochum